Waste management in Taiwan refers to the management and disposal of waste in Taiwan. It is regulated by the Department of Waste Management of the Environmental Protection Administration of the Executive Yuan.

History

In the 1950s and 1960s, Taiwan began to industrialize. In the following decades, industrialization occurred more rapidly, leading to a higher waste output. Taiwan then became known as the Garbage Island. To combat increased levels of waste, a recycling program began in 1989, following a 1987 amendment to the Waste Disposal Act. Recycling in Taiwan started as a private effort, but the initiative soon became overrun with fraud and other scandals due to ineffective government regulation. The private organizations and industries in charge of the program were free to falsely report recycling rates. The government established the 3R Foundation (reduce, reuse, recycle) in 1994 to discourage instances of fraud and other scandals. Recyclables were reclassified into eight groups: containers, tires, pesticide containers, lubricant oil, lead-acid batteries, vehicles, home appliances, and communication products. Each of these materials were the responsibility of one commission, and the commissions themselves were overseen by the Environmental Protection Administration. Taiwan's limited space to build trash incinerators and landfills were recognized as a problem, but from the 1980s and as late as 1996, waste was freely placed in the streets for collection. At the time, Taiwan had five incinerators in operation; at full capacity, only 10% of annual combustible waste was disposed of via incineration. Other methods of garbage disposal placed a large amount of stress on existing landfills. The eight separate committees initially established by recyclable material were eventually merged into the Resource Recycling Fund Management Committee. General oversight of the recycling program has been placed under the purview of the Resource Recycling Fund Management Committee, but a separate committee handles the establishment of recycling fees, and another committee is called on to periodically audit the recycling program itself.

Waste collection and disposal
People are responsible for bringing their own trash to the collection point. In some areas such as Taipei City, nonrecyclables must be collected in colour-coded bags that can be bought at convenience stores. Raw food waste is processed to be further used as fertilizer by farmers. Cooked food waste is processed to be further turned into food for livestock. Not all recyclables are collected daily; the most common recyclables have a specially designated pickup day. There are 33 items considered recyclable, which in turn fall into 13 categories.

Garbage collection trucks are known to play music to alert people of their presence at collection points. Songs played include Tekla Bądarzewska-Baranowska's "Maiden's Prayer" and Ludwig van Beethoven's "Für Elise." Starting in 2003, recycling trucks played Hou Dejian's composition, "Any Empty Wine Bottles for Sale?" as first recorded by Su Rui for the 1983 film Papa, Can You Hear Me Sing. Christmas music is played during Christmas, and at Chinese New Year, recordings of Chinese traditional tunes play. Local governments have occasionally changed the garbage collection song. Other prerecorded tracks played on the trucks include short English-language lessons.

Power generation
In 2016, 76.8% of fly ash from coal-fired power plants in Taiwan were reused in the construction areas, totaling to 1.703 million tons. Any remaining industrial waste from power generation industries, such as wire, cables and scrap were reused by waste disposal contractors through open bidding process. In 2016, there was 4,950 tons of such waste sold, which generated a revenue of NT$533 million.

Recycling facilities

Incinerators

Incomplete list of incinerators in Taiwan. Please expand this list and correct it, if necessary.

References

Environment of Taiwan
Taiwan